Harry Howard Varner (December 18, 1885 – November 3, 1970) was an American football coach. He served as the head football coach at the University of Virginia for one season in 1915, compiling a record of 8–1. Varner was born in Warrenton, Virginia in 1885.  He later worked as a surgeon in El Paso, Texas. He died there after suffering from prostate cancer in 1970.

Head coaching record

References

External links
 

1885 births
1970 deaths
Virginia Cavaliers football coaches
Virginia Tech Hokies football players
Physicians from Texas
Players of American football from El Paso, Texas
People from Warrenton, Virginia
Deaths from cancer in Texas
Deaths from prostate cancer